Iran participated in the 1998 Asian Games held in the capital city of Bangkok. This country is ranked 7th with 10 gold medals in this edition of the Asiad.

Competitors

Medal summary

Medal table

Medalists

Results by event

Aquatics

Diving

Men

Swimming

Men

Water polo

Men

Archery 

Men

Athletics 

Men

Badminton 

Men

Basketball 

Men

Boxing 

Men

Canoeing 

Men

Women

Cycling

Road

Men

Track

Men

Equestrian 

Jumping

Fencing 

Men

Football

Men

Gymnastics

Artistic

Men

Handball

Men

Judo

Men

Karate

Men's kumite

Men's kata

Shooting

Men

Women

Squash

Men

Table tennis 

Men

Taekwondo

Men

Tennis

Men

Volleyball

Beach

Men

Weightlifting

Men

Wrestling

Men's freestyle

Men's Greco-Roman

Wushu

Men's taolu

Men's sanda

References

External links
  Iran Olympic Committee - Asian Games Medalists
  Iran National Sports Organization - Asian Games Medalists

Nations at the 1998 Asian Games
1998
Asian Games